Skocznia Skalite im. Beskidzkich Olimpijczyków (Beskid Olympians Skalite Ski Jumping Hill) are a ski jumping hills in Szczyrk, Poland.

History
Firs jumps up to 40 meters were held in 1937 and first renovation in 1953. Krzysztof Leja holds the hill record since 2011. There are also smaller HS 44 and HS 77 hills.

Ski jumping venues in Poland
Sports venues in Silesian Voivodeship
Sports venues completed in 1953
Bielsko County